Brasseur is a French-language surname, meaning "brewer" and may refer to:

A family of French actors:
 Pierre Brasseur (1905–1972), a French actor
 Claude Brasseur (1936-2020), a French actor
 Alexandre Brasseur (born 1971), a French actor

A family of Luxembourgian politicians:
 Dominique Brasseur (1833–1906), a Luxembourgian politician
 Robert Brasseur (1870–1934), a Luxembourgian politician
 Xavier Brasseur (1865–1912), a Luxembourgian politician

Others:
 André Brasseur (born 1939), a Belgian musician
 Anne Brasseur (born 1950), a Luxembourgian politician
 Charles Étienne Brasseur de Bourbourg (1814–1874), a French historian
 Élisabeth Brasseur (1896–1972), French choral conductor
 Isabelle Brasseur (born 1970), a Canadian figure skater

See also
 Brauer
 Breuer
 Brewer
 Brouwer
 Sládek

French-language surnames
Occupational surnames